Governor Machado may refer to:

Juan Francisco Machado (fl. 1770s-80s), Governor of the Spanish Colony Trinidad from 1781 to 1784
Joaquim José Machado (1847–1925), Governor of the Province of Mozambique from 1890 to 1891 and 110th Governor of Portuguese India from  1897 to 1900